Kotiabad (also Romanized as Kotīābād; also known as Kalīābād) is a village in Rezvaniyeh Rural District, in the Central District of Tiran and Karvan County, Isfahan Province, Iran. At the 2006 census, its population was 13, in 6 families.

References 

Populated places in Tiran and Karvan County